Celer may refer to:

People
 Celer (builder), foreman appointed by Romulus to oversee the building of Rome's first walls.
 Quintus Caecilius Metellus Celer, consul of the Roman Republic, 60 BC
 Publius Egnatius Celer, first century Stoic philosopher
 Celer (magister officiorum), 6th century Byzantine minister
 Saint Gelert, 7th century Welsh saint

Biology
 Misumenops celer, the celer crab spider
 Thermococcus celer, a species of extremely thermophilic Archaea
 Laosaurus (Laosaurus celer), a genus of hypsilophodont dinosaur
 Microvenator (Microvenator celer), a genus of dinosaur from the Early Cretaceous Cloverly Formation
 Trichoniscus pusillus (Philougria celer), one of the five most common species of woodlouse in the British Isles

Other
 Celer (group), is an experimental music group based in Tokyo, Japan
 Chery Celer, a subcompact car

See also
 Cele (disambiguation)
 Celeres, a personal armed guard maintained by Romulus
 Celerity (disambiguation)
 Celeron
 Celery
 Cellar (disambiguation)
 Celler (disambiguation)
 Cello